In Major League Baseball, the Manager of the Year Award is an honor given annually since 1983 to two outstanding managers, one each in the American League (AL) and the National League (NL). The winner is voted on by 30 members of the Baseball Writers' Association of America (BBWAA). Each submits a vote for first, second, and third place among the managers of each league. The manager with the highest score in each league wins the award.

Several managers have won the award in a season in which they led their team to 100 or more wins.  They are:
Lou Piniella – 116 (Seattle Mariners, 2001)
Joe Torre – 114 (New York Yankees, 1998)
Gabe Kapler – 107 (San Francisco Giants, 2021)
Sparky Anderson – 104 (Detroit Tigers, 1984)
Tony La Russa – 104 (Oakland Athletics, 1988)
Dusty Baker – 103 (San Francisco Giants, 1993)
Larry Dierker – 102 (Houston Astros, 1998)
Whitey Herzog – 101 (St. Louis Cardinals, 1985)
Rocco Baldelli – 101 (Minnesota Twins, 2019)
Buck Showalter – 101 (New York Mets, 2022)
Kevin Cash – 100 (Tampa Bay Rays, 2021)

In 1991, Bobby Cox became the first manager to win the award in both leagues, winning with the Atlanta Braves and having previously won with the Toronto Blue Jays in 1985. La Russa, Piniella, Showalter, Jim Leyland, Bob Melvin, Davey Johnson, and Joe Maddon have since won the award in both leagues. Cox, La Russa, and Showalter have won the most awards, with four. Baker, Leyland, Piniella, Maddon, Melvin, and Terry Francona have won three times. In 2005, Cox became the first manager to win the award in consecutive years.  Cash became the second manager in 2021, and first in the AL, to win the award in consecutive years. Terry Francona and Buck Showalter are the most recent winners.

Because of the 1994–95 Major League Baseball strike cut the season short and canceled the post-season, the BBWAA writers effectively created a de facto mythical national championship (similar to college football) by naming managers of the unofficial league champions (lead the leagues in winning percentage) (Buck Showalter and Felipe Alou) as Managers of the Year. The Chicago White Sox have seen five managers win the award, most in the majors, while one franchise, the Milwaukee Brewers, has not had a manager win the award.

Only five managers have won the award while leading a team that finished outside the top two spots in its division. Buck Rodgers was the first, winning the award in 1987 with the third-place Expos. Tony Peña and Showalter won the award with third-place teams in back-to-back years: Peña with the Royals in 2003, and Showalter with the Rangers in 2004. Joe Girardi is the only manager to win the award with a fourth-place team (2006 Florida Marlins); he is also the only manager to win the award after fielding a team with a losing record.

Key

Winners

American League

National League

Notes
The 1994–95 Major League Baseball strike ended the season on August 11, as well as cancelling the entire postseason, with writers effectively turning the vote into a de facto mythical national championship, similar to college football. 
Johnny Oates and Joe Torre tied for the lead among voters in the American League in 1996.
Teams played a truncated 60-game season in 2020 due to the COVID-19 pandemic.

See also

"Esurance MLB Awards" Best Manager (in MLB)
Baseball America Manager of the Year
Baseball Prospectus Internet Baseball Awards Manager of the Year
Chuck Tanner Major League Baseball Manager of the Year Award
Associated Press Manager of the Year (discontinued in 2001)
Honor Rolls of Baseball #Managers
MLB All-Time Manager (1997; BBWAA)
Sporting News Manager of the Decade (2009)
Sports Illustrated MLB Manager of the Decade (2009)
Major League Baseball all-time managerial wins
Best Coach/Manager ESPY Award (all sports)

References
General

Inline citations

 

Major League Baseball trophies and awards
Awards established in 1983